North Carolina Highway 179 (NC 179) is a primary state highway in the U.S. state of North Carolina.  It runs from the South Carolina state line, near
Little River, to Shallotte.

Route description
Though NC 179 begins at the state line, SC 179 is a short  road that connects to US 17 in Little River.  From the state line, NC 179 goes through the town of Calabash.  With a short concurrency with NC 904, it continues northeast through Ocean Isle Beach ending in Shallotte. The entire route is two lanes wide.

History
Established in 1979, NC 179 was new routing over mostly existing secondary roads, including the concurrency with NC 904.  In August 2000, NC 179 was rerouted north around Sunset Beach; a year later NC 179 Business was established along the original route through Sunset Beach.

Junction list

Special routes

Calabash–Sunset Beach business loop

North Carolina Highway 179 Business (NC 179 Bus) was established in 2001 as an upgrade of secondary roads: Beach Drive, Shoreline Drive, and Sunset Beach Boulevard.

References

179
Transportation in Brunswick County, North Carolina